Sarah Cardwell (born 10 October 1991 in Melbourne) is a professional squash player who represents Australia. She reached a career-high world ranking of World No. 41 in February 2017.

References

External links 
 
 
 
 
 
 

1991 births
Living people
Australian female squash players
Commonwealth Games competitors for Australia
Squash players at the 2014 Commonwealth Games
21st-century Australian women